Qaterchi may refer to:
 Qaterchi, Lorestan
 Qaterchi, West Azerbaijan

See also
Tazeh Kand-e Qaterchi